Technological University, Mawlamyine is a technological and engineering university located in Mawlamyine, Mon State, Burma.

Technological University (Mawlamyine) is teaching a total number of 2203 students in the Academic year 2015–2016.

History 
On 15 December 1982, the technological department was separated from Mawlamyine University to form Government Technical Institute (Mawlamyine). It was renamed as Government Technological College (Mawlamyine) in 1999. It became an independent university in 2007.

Departments 
Civil Engineering Department
Electronic and Communication Engineering Department
Electrical Power Engineering Department
Mechanical Engineering Department
Information Technology Department

Former Department
Mechatronics Engineering Department

Programs

References

Mawlamyine
Universities and colleges in Mawlamyaing
Universities and colleges in Mon State
Technological universities in Myanmar
Universities and colleges in Myanmar